Eleonore Stump (born August 9, 1947) is an American philosopher who serves as the Robert J. Henle Professor of Philosophy at Saint Louis University, where she has taught since 1992.

Biography 
Stump received a BA in classical languages from Grinnell College in 1969, where she was valedictorian and received the Archibald Prize for scholarship; she has an MA in biblical studies (New Testament) from Harvard University (1971), and an MA and PhD in medieval studies (medieval philosophy) from Cornell University (1975). Before coming to Saint Louis University, she taught at Oberlin College, Virginia Polytechnic Institute and State University, and University of Notre Dame. Currently, she also holds secondary or honorary appointments at Wuhan University, the University of St Andrews, and Australian Catholic University.

She has published extensively in medieval philosophy, philosophy of religion, and contemporary metaphysics. Her books include her major study Aquinas (Routledge, 2003), her extensive treatment of the problem of evil, Wandering in Darkness: Narrative and the Problem of Suffering (Oxford, 2010), her recent treatment of the Christian doctrine of the atonement, Atonement (Oxford, 2018), and her recent treatment of the problem of mourning, The Image of God (Oxford, 2022).

Among the named lectureships she has given are the Gifford Lectures (Aberdeen, 2003), the Wilde lectures (Oxford, 2006), the Stewart lectures (Princeton, 2009), and the Stanton Lectures (Cambridge, 2018). In 2013, the American Catholic Philosophical Association awarded her the Aquinas medal.

She has held grants from the Danforth Foundation, the Mellon Foundation, the National Endowment for the Humanities, the American Association of University Women, the National Humanities Center, and the Pew Charitable Trust. In addition, she has received several teaching awards, including, in 2004, the Robert Foster Cherry Award for Great Teaching from Baylor University. For 2013–15, together with John Greco, she held a $3.3 million grant from the John Templeton Foundation for a project on intellectual humility. In 2017 she was awarded an honorary doctorate from Tilburg University, the Netherlands.

She has served as president of the Society of Christian Philosophers, the American Catholic Philosophical Association, the American Philosophical Association, Central Division, and the Philosophers in Jesuit Education. She is also a member of the American Academy of Arts and Sciences.

Bibliography

External links 
 Eleonore Stump – Personal page
 Eleonore Stump Homepage at Saint Louis University
 Eleonore Stump on Philpapers

1947 births
21st-century American philosophers
Catholic philosophers
Cornell University alumni
Grinnell College alumni
Harvard University alumni
Living people
Metaphysicians
Philosophers of religion
Presidents of the American Philosophical Association
Presidents of the Society of Christian Philosophers
Saint Louis University faculty
Scholars of medieval philosophy
Analytical Thomists